An image song or character song is a song on a tie-in single or album (often called an image album or character album) for an anime, game, dorama, manga, or commercial product that is sometimes sung by the voice actor or actor of a character, in character with backing vocals.  It is meant to give a sense of the personality of the character.

Character songs are considered an important part of an anime or doramas success, as they often provide insights to a character that may otherwise go unexplored on the program itself. The series' creators may also include details about a particular character's design stages and evolution, and on occasion even design sketches so fans can see for themselves how a character changed. There may also be comments from the voice actors or actors on how they feel about playing their characters. Sometimes character songs are incorporated into the anime itself, such as Kyōran Kazoku Nikki, which has each of its main characters sing a character song as the ending theme, each with its own animation.  Another example is Prince of Tennis, which has the openings and ending songs for the OVA episodes sung by characters in the anime.

Character songs are not restricted to anime protagonists. Antagonists such as Zechs Merquise, Master Asia, Sailor Galaxia, and some of the villains (such as Devimon and Sōsuke Aizen) also have their own character songs. In some cases, these are regarded as more interesting than those of the protagonists as they often provide the only glimpse into a villain's character.

In addition, fans are known to buy character song albums based solely on the voice actor or actor. An example of this is Megumi Hayashibara, a well-known voice actress who has released many CDs and albums over her career, including character songs of her characters.

The K-On! characters later became the first anime image group to reach No. 1 in the Oricon singles chart in 2010, with the opening theme for the second season of the show, "Go! Go! Maniac!", which debuted at No. 1 with sales of over 83,000 copies in its first week.

Character version
A related sub-type is a character version, where a voice actor or actor sings a song from the series as the character. A famous example of this are the various versions of Neon Genesis Evangelions theme songs, redone by the voice actresses of Rei Ayanami, Asuka Langley Soryu and Misato Katsuragi. They are usually identified by a version tag at the end of the name (e.g. "Cruel Angel's Thesis, Ayanami Version").

Character song
Similarly, a character song can also be a song about a character, but not necessarily sung by the character's portrayer. For example, while Mazinger Z includes songs about Kouji Kabuto and his friends, they are not sung by their voice actors. Nevertheless, they still provide some insight into the character's persona.

In the Pokémon anime, Dawn and Serena's image song were not sung by their voice actors originally either, although later introduced their voice actors' version.

See also
 Leitmotif

References

 
Song forms
Anime and manga terminology